Rudolf of Zähringen (also Rudolph, Ralph or Raoul) (c. 1135 – 5 August 1191) was the archbishop of Mainz from 1160 to 1161 and prince-bishop of Liège. He was the son of Conrad I of Zähringen and Clemence of Luxembourg-Namur.

After the death of Arnold of Selenhofen, the citizens of Mainz elected him archbishop, but the city had been placed under the interdict and the aristocracy and clergy had fled to Frankfurt am Main, where they elected Christian of Buch instead. Neither election was recognised by the emperor, Frederick Barbarossa. At the Synod of Lodi, both archbishops-elect were deposed and Rudolf was excommunicated.

In 1167, already released from his excommunication, he became bishop of Liège, a position almost as secularly important as that of Mainz. As bishop, he supported his brother, Berthold IV, Duke of Zähringen. On 11 May 1188, he arrived at the Siege of Acre with an army. He died on the way back from the Crusade, at Herdern. He was buried in the monastery of Saint Peter's there.

Ancestry

Sources

1130s births
1191 deaths
Year of birth uncertain
Rudolf
Christians of the Third Crusade
12th-century Prince-Bishops of Liège
Archbishops of Mainz
People temporarily excommunicated by the Catholic Church
Prince-Bishops of Liège
Armed priests